KTGL (92.9 FM) is a radio station broadcasting a classic rock format. Licensed to Beatrice, Nebraska, United States, the station serves the Lincoln area.  The station is currently owned by Alpha Media. KTGL's studios are located on Cornhusker Highway in Northeast Lincoln, while its transmitter is located near Cortland.

References

External links

TGL
Classic rock radio stations in the United States
Radio stations established in 1977